Changzhou or Chang Prefecture was a zhou (prefecture) in imperial China, centering on modern western Chongqing, China. It existed (intermittently) from 785 until 1290.

Geography
The administrative region of Chang Prefecture in the Tang dynasty was in modern western Chongqing (which borders Sichuan). It probably includes parts of modern: 
Dazu District
Rongchang District
Yongchuan District

References
 

Prefectures of the Tang dynasty
Prefectures of Former Shu
Prefectures of Later Shu
Prefectures of Later Tang
Prefectures of the Song dynasty
Prefectures of the Yuan dynasty
Former prefectures in Chongqing